Barhadbesciabas (alternately Barhadbesaba or Barhadbescialas) (died  July 20, 355) is venerated as a Christian martyr who was decapitated during the reign of Shapur II.  A deacon of Arbela, in the Sassanid Empire, he was arrested by the governor of Arbela, Sapor Tamaspor, and put on the rack.

Tradition states that the authorities ordered Aghaeus, an apostate Christian nobleman, to kill Barhadbesciabas with a sword.

Another Christian of the same name was martyred with Abda and Abdjesus in 366.

His feast day is July 21.

References

Holweck, F. G. A Biographical Dictionary of the Saints. St. Louis, MO: B. Herder Book Co., 1924.

External links
Saints of July 15: Barhadbesaba (Barhadbesciabas), Deacon

Persian saints
People executed by the Sasanian Empire
Christians in the Sasanian Empire
4th-century Christian martyrs
Year of birth unknown